Greene County Community School District (GCCSD) is a rural public school district headquartered in Jefferson, Iowa.

The district is almost entirely in Greene County while small portions are in Boone County. Communities served are Jefferson, Dana, Grand Junction, Rippey and Scranton.

It formed on July 1, 2014, as the consolidation of the East Greene and Jefferson–Scranton school districts. They began "grade sharing" (in which students from one district attended school in another district for certain grade levels) the previous school year.

, it has about 1,100 students and 200 employees.

Schools
All schools are in Jefferson.
 Greene County High School
 Greene County Middle School 
 Greene County Elementary School

The Greene County district continued operating the Grand Junction school until 2017. In 2017, the Grand Junction city government decided to demolish the former Grand Junction school.

The district acquired the Rippey School, which was already closed. The Rippey School was demolished in 2014.

Greene County High School

Athletics
The Rams compete in the Heart of Iowa Conference in the following sports:

Esports
Rainbow Six Siege, Smash Bros Ultimate, etc
Cross Country 
Volleyball
Football
Basketball 
Wrestling
Track and Field
 Girls' 1994 Class 2A State Champions
Soccer
Golf 
Baseball 
Softball

See also
List of school districts in Iowa
List of high schools in Iowa

References

External links
 Greene County Community School District
 Greene County Community School District at Edline

School districts established in 2014
School districts in Iowa
2014 establishments in Iowa
Education in Greene County, Iowa
Education in Boone County, Iowa